Park Hyuk-kwon (born July 11, 1971) is a South Korean actor. Park began his acting career in 1993 as a member of the theater troupe Sanulrim. He later became a well-regarded supporting actor in films such as Chaw (2009) and Secret Reunion (2010), as well as the television series Behind the White Tower (2007), Secret Love Affair (2014) and The Producers (2015). Park also frequently stars in short films and independent films, notably in Milky Way Liberation Front (2007) and other works by Yoon Seong-ho.

Filmography

Film

Television series

Theater 
 Subway Line 1
 Checkmate
 Carmen on Fire
 Seoul Notes

Awards and nominations

References

External links
  
 Park Hyuk-kwon at Family Actors Entertainment 
 
 
 

1971 births
Living people
Mystic Entertainment artists
South Korean male film actors
South Korean male television actors
South Korean male stage actors
South Korean male musical theatre actors
People from Incheon
Seoul Institute of the Arts alumni
20th-century South Korean male actors
21st-century South Korean male actors